Bret Iwan (born September 10, 1982) is an American voice actor and illustrator. He has been the fourth official voice of Mickey Mouse following the death of Wayne Allwine in May 2009.

Early life 
Bret Iwan was born on September 10, 1982, and raised in Pasadena, California; he is the son of Bill and Fiona Iwan.

He attended LeRoy High School in Le Roy, Illinois, from 1996 to 2000. He graduated from the Ringling College of Art and Design in Sarasota, Florida, in 2004. Iwan was previously an illustrator at Hallmark.

Career 
Iwan was hired to voice Mickey Mouse and replace Wayne Allwine after the latter died on May 18, 2009. Iwan had previously understudied for the role when Allwine was facing health difficulties, and Iwan credits Allwine's archival work as providing excellent mentorship.

Iwan first recorded Mickey Mouse dialogue for the Disney's Animal Kingdom theme park as well as the 2009 shows Disney On Ice: Celebrations and Disney Live: Rockin' Road Show. He voiced Mickey Mouse in Have a Laugh!. He gave his first full performance as Mickey Mouse for the English version of the PlayStation Portable game Kingdom Hearts Birth by Sleep.

His first voice-over work in a Disney Park could be heard in the Animal Kingdom closing show "Adventurers' Celebration Gathering" as well as on the Tomorrowland Transit Authority PeopleMover attraction at the Magic Kingdom in which, upon passing through Mickey's Star Traders, Mickey responds with his signature laugh and says, "That's right, it's outta this world!"

Personal life 
Iwan is gay, and thus the first LGBTQIA+ performer  to voice Mickey Mouse. He married his longtime partner, art director Douglas Hoffman, in July 2021.

Filmography

Film

Television

Video games

Theme park attractions

References

External links 
 
 Bret Iwan at Voice Chasers 
 Bret Iwan Interview

1982 births
Living people
21st-century American male actors
American gay actors
American gay artists
American illustrators
American male voice actors
American male video game actors
American people of Welsh descent
Disney people
Artists from Pasadena, California
Male actors from Pasadena, California
Ringling College of Art and Design alumni
21st-century American LGBT people